Belaj may refer to:

Places
 Belaj, Albania, in Shkodër County
 Belaj, Cerovlje, Istria, Croatia
 Belaj, Mawal, Pune district, Maharashtra, India

People
 Amalija Belaj (born 1939), Slovenian cross-country skier
 Vitomir Belaj (born 1937) Slovenian-born Croatian ethnologist